David Alexander (December 23, 1914 – March 6, 1983) was an American television director. He directed episodes of the CBS series The Best of Broadway and several popular 1960s television shows, including: My Favorite Martian, Petticoat Junction, Get Smart, The Munsters, F Troop and The Brady Bunch. He also directed two episodes, Plato's Stepchildren and The Way to Eden, of Star Trek: The Original Series.

On Broadway, he directed the 1952 revival of Pal Joey (musical). This production had the longest run of any revival of a musical in the history of the Broadway theatre at the time.

References

External links
 

1914 births
1983 deaths
American television directors
Artists from New York City